Ian Hunter (born 10 August 1961) is an Australian former association footballer.

Playing career

Club career
Hunter made his National Soccer League debut for Blacktown City in 1980. In 1981, he transferred to Marconi before a stint at Penrith City. He returned to Blacktown City in 1991.

International career
In 1978, he toured with the Australian Schoolboy team that played in the United States and Canada.

Hunter played for the Australian under-20 team in 1978 in 1979 FIFA World Youth Championship qualifying matches against Papua New Guinea and New Zealand as well as in a friendly match against Vardar Skopje.

In 1979 Hunter toured with an Australian under-20 team that played matches against a number of club and national youth teams. He played in wins against Hertha Zehlendorf in Wollongong, Flamengo in Rio de Janeiro and a draw against Israel in Paraguay.

Hunter made his full international debut for Australia at the 1980 OFC Nations Cup against Papua New Guinea at the age of 18 years and 200 days. Hunter came on as a substitute at half time in the match before scoring three goals in an 11-2 win for Australia. In four matches at the tournament, including three B international matches, Hunter scored five goals tying with Eddie Krncevic as leading goalscorer.

In 1981, he played four matches as captain of the Australia under-20 team that made the quarter finals of the 1981 FIFA World Youth Championship held in Australia. He scored a goal in Australia's opening match of the tournament against Argentina, a match Australia won 2-1.

Coaching career
Hunter coached Springwood in the New South Wales Second Division in 2008.

References

1961 births
Living people
Association football forwards
Australian soccer players
Australia international soccer players
1980 Oceania Cup players